Elections to City of Bradford Metropolitan District Council were held on 1 May 2003. Before the election, Wibsey Labour councillor, Keith Thomson, had defected to Independent. One third of the council was up for election, and it remained under no overall control.

Election result

This result had the following consequences for the total number of seats on the council after the elections:

Ward results

By-elections between 2003 and 2004

References

2003
2003 English local elections
2000s in West Yorkshire